The 2015–16 Oberliga Niederrhein was the 60th season of the Oberliga Niederrhein, one of three state association league systems in the state of North Rhine-Westphalia, covering its northwestern part. It was the fourth season of the league as a fifth level of the German football league system.

League table 
The league featured five new clubs for the 2015–16 season with TV Kalkum-Wittlaer, 1. FC Mönchengladbach, SpVg Schonnebeck and SC Düsseldorf-West promoted from the Landesliga Niederrhein while KFC Uerdingen 05 had been relegated from the Regionalliga West.

Top goalscorers 
The top goal scorers:

Promotion play-off
The runners-up of the two divisions of the Landesliga Niederrhein compete for one more spot in the Oberliga.

|}

References

External links 
 

2015–16 Oberliga
2015-16